Robert Newman is a motion picture literary agent  and partner at William Morris Endeavor. He was previously head of International Creative Management’s motion picture literary department.

References

American talent agents
Living people
Year of birth missing (living people)
Place of birth missing (living people)
Hollywood talent agents